Teleflora is a floral wire service company which brokers orders to local florists for delivery. It has been a subsidiary of The Wonderful Company since 1979.

History
Headquartered in Los Angeles, California, Teleflora, LLC is a clearinghouse for transmitting and processing floral orders to customers throughout the United States and internationally.  Teleflora, LLC was formerly known as Telegraph Delivery Service and was founded in 1934 by Edwin S. Douglas.   Privately owned since 1979 by Lynda Resnick and Stewart Resnick, husband and wife, the company has 3,000 employees worldwide in 20 countries. With more than 15,000 member florists throughout the US and Canada, it is the largest privately held floral wire service company in the world.

In 2013, Teleflora acquired Toronto-based Flowerbuyer.com, one of the most successful online wholesale flower-buying services in the world, with more than 2,500 active customers.

Advertising
Teleflora ran an advertisement during the 2011 Super Bowl featuring Faith Hill; in the advertisement, a man sends flowers to his girlfriend with the message "Dear Kim, your rack is unreal".  Unfortunately, his love letter is a "bust."    Teleflora's partnership with Faith Hill included a new collection of flower arrangements for Valentine's Day 2011.

In 2012, Teleflora ran a similar Super Bowl campaign, this time with model Adriana Lima.

References

Online retailers of the United States
Companies based in Los Angeles
Florist companies
Retail companies established in 1934
The Wonderful Company
1934 establishments in California